Beltojë is a settlement in the former Bërdicë municipality, Shkodër County, northern Albania. At the 2015 local government reform it became part of the municipality Shkodër.

Notable People
Hamza Bey Kazazi - Albanian rebel leader and Patriot of the 19th century.

References

Bërdicë
Populated places in Shkodër
Villages in Shkodër County